Vater is the first studio album by electronic band Janus. It was released in 1998 on Trisol Records. The album was re-released (self-released) as Vater Deluxe in 2006, with bonus tracks.

Track listing
"Isaak"–6:02
"Schwarzer Witwer"–9:02
"Lolita / Knochenhaus"–10:32
"Exodus"–3:06
"Saitenspiel"–6:30
"Der Flüsterer im Dunkeln"–9:45
"Dreizehn Bestien"–5:36

Info
 All tracks written and produced by Janus
 Vocals by Dirk Riegert
 Programming and piano by Tobias Hahn

External links
 Janus Discography Info

1998 albums
Janus (musical project) albums